Robert Dobson Millner (born 4 September 1950) is an Australian corporate executive. He is the chairman of Washington H. Soul Pattinson, Australia's second oldest publicly-listed corporation, and the chairman of New Hope Coal, Brickworks Limited, Choiseul Investments and NBN Television.

Biography
After leaving Newington College he worked as a stockbroker for two years. From 1970 until 1983 he farmed in Cowra, New South Wales and in 1984 joined the family business, Washington H. Soul Pattinson, as a director. In 1997, he was appointed deputy chairman of the company and since 1999 he has been Chairman of the company.

Net worth

References

People educated at Newington College
Australian businesspeople
Businesspeople from Sydney
Living people
1950 births
Australian billionaires